The .22 Winchester Automatic (also known as the .22 Winchester Auto and occasionally .22 Win Auto) is a  American rimfire rifle cartridge.

Introduced for the Winchester Model 1903 semiautomatic rifle, the .22 Win Auto was never used in any other firearm. It will not chamber correctly in other .22 rimfire weapons, nor will other .22 rimfire ammunition, including the very dimensionally-similar .22 Remington Automatic, interchange with it. This feature was to prevent use of black powder rounds, which were still popular when it first appeared, from being used in the M1903, resulting in powder residue rapidly clogging the action and rendering the weapon inoperable.

The power of the .22 Win Auto is comparable to the .22 Long rimfire, and while it fires a heavier bullet, it offers no performance edge on either the .22 Long or the very much more common .22 Long Rifle.

See also
List of cartridges by caliber
List of rifle cartridges
List of rimfire cartridges
5 mm caliber

References

Notes
Barnes, Frank C., ed. by John T. Amber. ".22 Winchester Automatic", in Cartridges of the World, pp.275, 282, & 283. Northfield, IL: DBI Books, 1972. .

Pistol and rifle cartridges
Rimfire cartridges
Winchester Repeating Arms Company cartridges
Weapons and ammunition introduced in 1903